is a retired Japanese sprinter. He competed in the 4 × 100 metres relay at the 2005 World Championships finishing eighth.

Competition record

Personal bests

References

External links

Tatsuro Yoshino at JAAF 
Tatsuro Yoshino at TBS  (archived)

1982 births
Living people
Japanese male sprinters
World Athletics Championships athletes for Japan
Universiade medalists in athletics (track and field)
Universiade gold medalists for Japan
Medalists at the 2003 Summer Universiade